Aymaki is a rural locality (a selo) in Gergebilsky District, Republic of Dagestan, Russia. The population was 2,342 as of 2010. There are 14 streets.

Geography 
Aymaki is located 11 km northeast of Gergebil (the district's administrative centre) by road. Akhkent and Okli are the nearest rural localities.

References 

Rural localities in Gergebilsky District